Maurice Benayoun (aka MoBen or 莫奔) (born 29 March 1957) is a French new-media artist, curator, and theorist based in Paris and Hong Kong.

His work employs various media, including video, computer graphics, immersive virtual reality, the Internet, performance, EEG, 3D Printing, large-scale urban media art, robotics, NFTs, and Blockchain based artworks, installations and interactive exhibitions.

Biography
Born in Mascara, Algeria, in March 1957, as a war orphan. His father was killed before his birth in the Algerian independence war. He moved to France in 1958, following his mother and his brother, to live in popular suburbs in north Paris where the family stayed during most of his childhood.

Education
Bennayoun's doctorate thesis at the Sorbonne, Artistic Intentions at Work, Hypothesis for Committing Art, was published in 2011.

Career

Benayoun taught in contemporary and fine arts at Pantheon-Sorbonne University. In 1987 he co-founded Z-A Production (1987–2003), a computer graphics and virtual reality private lab. 

Between 1990 and 1993, Benayoun collaborated with Belgian graphic novelists François Schuiten and philosopher Benoît Peeters on Quarxs, the first animation series made of HD computer graphics, exploring variant creatures with alternate physical laws.

For his first solo show, Benayoun presented a virtual reality installation linking two art museums: the Pompidou Center in Paris and the Musée d'art contemporain de Montréal. Benayoun conceived and directed the exhibition Cosmopolis, Overwriting the City (2005), an art and science immersive installation presented during the French Year in China in Shanghai, Beijing, Chengdu, and Chongqing. This was Maurice Benayoun's first experience in China, and the reception by the public played an important role in later Benayoun's move to Asia.

Key concepts 
Sublimation vs Reification – Benayoun identified two main trends affect the evolution of the human experience of materiality. Borrowing the term from chemistry, Sublimation is the operation converting the world into data that can be treated at the same time by natural or artificial intelligence. This allows the cognitive integration of the physical as well as its absolute control. 
Coming from Karl Marx, Reification is the conversion of thoughts into objects. The process requires EEG (Electro Encephalography) and BCI (Brain-Computer Interaction) in association with construction technologies like 3D Printing.

Open Media, in 2000, considered his works as a form of Open Media Art, paraphrasing Jon Ippolito, not limited to the traditional forms, media and economic schemes of art, but also not necessarily based on a specific medium, digital or using technologies. Open takes here the sense of freedom in the means of expression.

Infra-realism – (Infra-realisme in French, could be interpreted as 'sub-realism') was coined in the early 90s to describe the specificity of the new form of realism emerging from 3D computer graphics. During the production of Quarxs (1989–1993), the author, Benayoun wanted to identify the difference between visual realism based on the transcription of how the world reflects light, and what he called Infra-realism, or "realism of the depth" or "the deep realism behind the surface".

Selected awards

 Prix Ars Electronica Visionary Pioneer of Media Art (nomination), 2014
 SACD Award, Interactive Arts, Paris, June 2009
 Golden Nica (first prize), interactive art category, ARS ELECTRONICA Festival, Linz, Austria, 1998
 Jose Abel Prize, Best European animation film, Cinanima, Animation Film Festival of Espinho, Portugal, October 1994
 Best Electronic Special Effects, International Monitor Awards, Los Angeles, 1993
 Best Video Paint Design, International Monitor Award, Los Angeles 1993
 First Prize Pixel INA, Opens Title category Imagina '93, Monte Carlo, February 1993
 First Prize, Third Dimension Award, SCAM, Paris, November 1991
 1st Prize, Artistic Animation category, Truevision competition, SIGGRAPH, Las Vegas, 1991

References

Citations

General sources 
 ADA, Archive of Digital Art, Missing Matter, 
 FMX/09, Paris ACM SIGGRAPH, ZA Story, the Quarxs, God and the Devil,, 2009
 Benayoun, M.,"A Nano-Leap for Mankind" in The Dump, 207 Hypotheses for Committing Art, bilingual (English/French) Fyp éditions, France, July 2011, pp. 349–351. 
 Benayoun, M., "Architecture reactive de la communication" (French), July 1998

Further reading 
 Maurice Benayoun, The Dump, 207 Hypotheses for Committing Art, bilingual (English/French) Fyp éditions, France, July 2011, 
 Timothy Murray, Derrick de Kerckhove, Oliver Grau, Kristine Stiles, Jean-Baptiste Barrière, Dominique Moulon, Jean-Pierre Balpe, Maurice Benayoun Open Art 1980 - 2010, Nouvelles éditions Scala, 2011, French version, 
 Maurice Benayoun, Josef Bares, Urban Media Art Paradox: Critical Fusion vs Urban Cosmetics in What Urban Media Art Can Do: Why, When, Where and How, Susa Pop, Tanya Toft, editors, AVedition publisher, 2016, pp. 81–89, 450–453, 
 Benayoun, M., The Nervous Breakdown of the Global Body, an Organic Model of the Connected World, in Proceedings of Futur en Seine 2009, ed. Cap Digital, 2010, .
 Sara and Tom Pendergast, Contemporary Artists St James Press, 2001, pp. 155–158, 
 Peter Weibel, Jeffrey Shaw, Future Cinema, MIT Press 2003, pp. 472,572-581, 
 Oliver Grau, Virtual Art, from Illusion to Immersion, MIT Press 2004, pp. 237–240,
 Frank Popper, From Technology to Virtual Art, MIT Press 2005, pp. 201–205, 
 Derrick de Kerckhove, The Architecture of Intelligence, Birkhäuser 2005, pp. 40,48,51,73,  
 Gerfried Stocker and Christine Schöpf, Flesh Factor, Ars Electronica Festival 1997, Verlag Springer 1997, pp. 312–315
 Fred Forest Art et Internet, Editions Cercle D'Art / Imaginaire Mode d'Emploi, pp. 61 – 63
 Christine Buci-Glucksmann, "L’art à l’époque virtuel", in Frontières esthétiques de l’art, Arts 8, Paris: L’Harmattan, 2004
 Dominique Moulon Moulon.net, Conférence Report: Media Art in France, Un Point d'Actu, L'Art Numerique, p. 123
 Barbara Robertson CGW.com, Without Bounds in CGW volume 32 issue 4 April 2009
 Dominique Moulon, Art Contemporain, Nouveaux Médias, Nouvelles éditions Scala, Paris 2011,

External links

Official Blog/creation The Dump

1957 births
Living people
French contemporary artists
French digital artists
New media artists
French installation artists
Virtual reality pioneers
People from Mascara, Algeria
French bloggers
French male writers
Male bloggers
Academic staff of Paris 8 University Vincennes-Saint-Denis